One Lonely Path is the debut album by Canadian funeral doom band Longing for Dawn. It was released through Twilight Foundation, which is a sister label of a label that is owned by Longing for Dawn's guitarist Frédéric Arbour, Cyclic Law Records. The first edition came in 1,000 copies worth of middlemount six-panel digipaks.

Track listing
All music by Frédéric Arbour. All lyrics by Stefan Laroche.

 Access to Deliverance - 10:22
 Lethal - 13:07
 Total Absence of Light - 11:31
 Ashes of Innocence - 13:54
 One Lonely Path - 4:48

Personnel
Frédéric Arbour - lead guitar, acoustic guitar, sound manipulations, artwork, mastering, engineering
Stefan Laroche - vocals, artwork
Stian Weideborg - rhythm guitar
Étienne Lepage - bass guitar
Sylvian Marquette - drums
Kevin Jones - bass guitar
Martin Gagnon - drums
Jean-Simon Rancourt - engineering
Pierre Rémillard - mixing
Virginie Turcotte - photography

References

2005 debut albums
Longing for Dawn albums